The Tikopia language is a Polynesian Outlier language from the island of Tikopia in the Solomon Islands. It is closely related to the Anuta language of the neighboring island of Anuta.  Tikopian is also spoken by the Polynesian minority on Vanikoro, who long ago migrated from Tikopia.

Introduction

History
Because of its remote and isolated location, Tikopia had few contacts with outside groups until well into the twentieth century. Tikopians
occasionally visited other islands, but these trips were limited by the large distances and great hazards involved in canoe ocean voyages. Contacts by Westerners began sporadically around the beginning of the nineteenth century, but in 1927, when Firth did his initial fieldwork in Tikopia, the indigenous culture was largely intact. The major contact agents were, first, missionaries and, later, labor recruiters. By the 1950s, all the Tikopians had become Christianized, and most of the native ritual practices had ceased. Much of the Tikopian life style has remained intact, but the forces of Westernization have been making inroads throughout the twentieth century.

Population
Tikopia is a small remote volcanic island that has a population of 1,200 people. It is the southwest of the Solomon Islands. There are about seventy-five different languages that are spoken on the Solomon Islands. Out of these languages seventy-one are living and four are extinct. Out of the living languages five are institutional, twenty-four are developing, twenty-six are vigorous, eight are in trouble, and eight are dying. Linguists refer this language as a Samoic or a Polynesian Outlier language. Polynesian Outlier languages are a number of Polynesian societies that lie outside the main region of the Polynesian Triangle. Some linguists also believe that Tikopia and Anuta are the dialects of the same language.  There are approximately 3320 speakers that speak the Tikopian language. The Tikopian language, Tikopia-Anuta, is part of the Austronesian language family.

Phonology

Consonants

// has a glide allophone of [] when preceding //.

There are eleven consonant phonemes that this language uses.  They use the letters /f, k, l, m, n, p, r, s, t, v, w, ng/ and the glottal stop. There have been debates from different linguists on whether or not Tikopia uses l or r.  Elbert claims that Tikopia is a language that uses l but not r and he strongly believes this because he believed Tikopia was a colony of Samoa.  Raymond Firth said, “Dumont DʻUrville published a small dictionary in 1834 where 235 words were collected.”  R was the most dominant in that dictionary because it appeared in 50 words while l appeared in only 15.  The language changed in over a century and modernly more words are used with l.  Raymond Firths own work shows that both l and r phonemes are used.  Not too many words use the letter l and are actually rarely heard in native speakers.

Vowels
The vowel phonemes are /i, e, a, o, u/.  The vowel length is similar to the consonant lengths.  Linguists do not interpret long vowels in writing so they use shortcuts like macrons (a line over the vowel indicating a longer length), but in Tikopia writing they use two identical juxtaposed vowels.  According to the Tikopia dictionary, “This has typographical simplicity, but may present a problem of interpretation as to where long vowel and rearticulation actually occur.

Grammar

Basic Word Order
The basic word order in Tikopia is Subject-Verb-Object, but sometimes they use the Verb-Subject-Object Typology.

Reduplication
Tikopia uses partial reduplication and it usually intensifies a verb to make it plural.  The suffix “nofo” is added to a verb and it makes the verb that is being acted upon by a subject plural, so it is acted upon by subjects.

Vocabulary

Loanwords
Throughout the history of the Tikopian language they made contact with the outside world.  During these times, there is a high chance that many words from other languages were borrowed and used in the language known as “loanwords”.  Some of these words are known as native to Tikopia, but the main sources of the borrowing words are from Anuta, Mota, Hawaiian, and most definitely English.
Words derived from English:
Pakutini- “Pumpkin”
Atamole- “Watermelon”
Rais- “Rice”
Pīni- “Beans”
Poi- “Tinned Meat”
Piksha- “Picture”
Kastom- “Custom”
Leta- “Letter”

Endangerment

Materials
Most of the recorded documents on this language come from the linguist Raymond Firth.  Tikopia did not have much documented until the twentieth century where Firth spent three trips to Tikopia.  In 1928 Firth spent a whole year on his first time to Tikopia; he revisited in 1952 for five more months and again in 1966.  Only one person had recorded documents before Firth in 1910, Reverend W. J. Durrad, and he stayed for a duration of 2 months.  With this valuable documentation, Raymond Firth was able to create a dictionary for the Tikopian language, Taranga Fakatikopia Ma Taranga Fakainglisi.  They also have a bible, limited YouTube videos and some song books.

Vitality
Tikopia is spoken throughout the Solomon Islands and is very well documented.  Raymond Firth spent a lot of his time making sure that Tikopia did not fall close to being extinct.  He created the dictionary with all his information and it was highly useful.  With his help Tikopia is nowhere near being extinct, therefore, according to ethnologue, Tikiopia is categorized as a developing language.

Further reading
Firth, Raymond. "Tikopia." Encyclopedia of World Cultures. 1996. Retrieved April 25, 2014 from Encyclopedia.com: http://www.encyclopedia.com/doc/1G2-3458000400.html
Kirch, Patrick V. (1982) Tikopia: The Prehistory and Ecology of a Polynesian Outlier.  Bishop Museum Press.

References

External links
 Te Rotu Te Kau Kava Tapu Anglican Holy Communion in Tikopia
 Paradisec has two collections of Arthur Cappell's materials (AC1, AC2) that include Tikopia language materials.
 “The story of Lapérouse”: Audio recording in the Tikopia language, recorded and annotated by linguist A. François, in open access (Pangloss Collection of CNRS, Paris).

Languages of the Solomon Islands
Futunic languages